Zamalek magazine is the official magazine of the Egyptian football club Zamalek.

Profile
Issues are released weekly, every Thursday. The magazine include news and reviews about the club, interviews with the players.

References

External links
 Official website

1997 establishments in Egypt
Arabic-language magazines
Association football magazines
Magazines published in Egypt
Magazines established in 1997
Mass media in Giza
Zamalek SC
Weekly magazines published in Egypt